The Adventures of Juku The Dog (1931)  is the first Estonian experimental animated short film, written and directed by Voldemar Päts, produced by Aleksaner Teppor and animation by cartoonist Elmar Jaanimägi. For the film about 5000 drawings were made. Out of the total of 180 meters (6 minutes) of shot film stock about 100m (4 minutes) have survived. The soundtrack for the silent film was provided by Records of the Tormolen Co. Parlophon. In total 2 films in the series were attempted, the second one called The Adventures of Juku on Earth and Water was not completed and has not survived.

Legacy

After the Great Depression and WWII hit Estonia, the first professional puppetoon animation studio in Estonia Nukufilm was established by Elbert Tuganov in 1958 and a traditional cel animation studio Joonisfilm by Rein Raamat in 1971. In modern times the most known Estonian Animation Director is Priit Pärn, the winner of Grand Prize at the Ottawa International Animation Festival in 1998.

On November 30, 2001, a commemorative plaque was opened on the sidewalk in front of Aleksander Teppor's original photo studio in Suur-Karja 9, Tallinn. The monument was dedicated to the film's producers for the 70th anniversary of the animation in Estonia. The Estonian Film Foundation released a digitally restored copy of the four-minute film from the "Kutsu-Juku Adventures" preserved in Finland in celebration. The plaque was crafted by Riho Unt and Julia Pihlak.

References

External links 
 
 

1931 films
1931 animated films
1931 short films
1930s animated short films
Silent short films
Estonian animated short films